Samuel Rudolph "Rudy" Insanally (born 23 January 1936) is a Guyanese diplomat. He has been Guyana's Permanent Representative to the United Nations since 1987 and was Minister of Minister of Foreign Affairs of Guyana from 2001 to 2008.

Early life
Insanally was born in Georgetown, Guyana. Before his career as a diplomat began, he taught French and Spanish in Jamaica at Kingston College and Jamaica College, as well as in Guyana at Queen's College and the University of Guyana.

Diplomatic career
In his first diplomatic posting, he was Counsellor to Guyana's Embassy to the United States from 1966 to 1969, and he subsequently became Guyana's charge d'affaires in Venezuela in 1970. He was briefly his country's Deputy Permanent Representative to the United Nations in 1972, then served as Ambassador to Venezuela (with additional accreditation for Colombia, Ecuador, and Peru) from 1972 to 1978. After this posting, he was Permanent Representative to the European Economic Community and Ambassador to Belgium; although living in Brussels, he was also Ambassador to Austria, Norway, and Sweden at this time.

Subsequently, having returned to Guyana, Insanally was Head of the Political Division covering the Western Hemisphere, also serving as Ambassador to Colombia and as High Commissioner to a number of Caribbean nations. He became the Permanent Representative (ambassador) of Guyana to the United Nations on 18 February 1987. At the UN, he was vice-president of the United Nations Council for Namibia prior to Namibian independence in 1990, and in April 1990 he was Vice-president/Rapporteur of the Special Session of the General Assembly on International Economic Cooperation. He was the President of the Forty-Eighth Session of the United Nations General Assembly, which was held from 1993 to 1994. He is the longest serving current delegate to the United Nations. In the course of Insanally's duties at the Permanent Mission to the UN, he concurrently served as Ambassador to Japan from 1992.

During his presidency, he convened a World Hearing on Development attended by a large number of eminent persons, including experts, academics and practitioners of development in June 1994. He also served as Chairman of the Open Ended Working Group on the question of Equitable Representation on and increase of the Membership of the Security Council.

Insanally was Chancellor of the University of Guyana from 1994 to 2001. He became Minister of Foreign Affairs in May 2001. After seven years in that post, the government announced on 28 March 2008 that Insanally had decided to resign as Foreign Minister for "health and other personal reasons", although he would "continue to discharge certain other responsibilities in his engagement with Government". His replacement, Carolyn Rodrigues, was sworn in on 10 April.

He is married to Bonita Insanally with one daughter, Dr. Amanda Insanally-Nunez.

Publications 
 Rudy Insanally, Multilateral Diplomacy for Small States: "The art of letting others have your way" (2012)
 Rudy Insanally, Dancing Between the Raindrops: A Dispatch From A Small State Diplomat (2015)
 Rudy Insanally, The Guyanese Culture: Fusion or Diffusion. (2018)
 S.R Insanally, The Mystery of God: The Principles of God Diplomacy. (2020)

Honors
 Order of Roraima (O.R). 1995. (Guyana ).
 Order of the Liberator. Grand Cordon. 1978 (Venezuela).
 Order of the Southern Cross, Grand Cordon. 2003. (Brazil).
 Order of the Rising Sun, Grand Cordon, 2009 (Japan).
 Doctor of Laws (Hon). Mount Holyoke College, Massachusetts. (USA).

Yearly Achievements

References

External links
Press Conference with Samuel Insanally, Minister of Foreign Affairs, Guyana, and Chair of Caribbean Community Council for Foreign and Community Relations (COFCOR); Janet Bostwick, Minister of Foreign Affairs, Commonwealth of the Bahamas; and Edwin Carrington, Secretary General of the Caribbean Community, US Department of State

1936 births
Living people
Presidents of the United Nations General Assembly
Permanent Representatives of Guyana to the United Nations
People from Georgetown, Guyana
Recipients of the Order of the Rising Sun
Foreign ministers of Guyana
Government ministers of Guyana
Ambassadors of Guyana to Colombia
Ambassadors of Guyana to Venezuela
Ambassadors of Guyana to Ecuador
Ambassadors of Guyana to Peru
Ambassadors of Guyana to Belgium
Ambassadors of Guyana to Austria
Ambassadors of Guyana to Norway
Ambassadors of Guyana to Sweden
Ambassadors of Guyana to the European Union
Ambassadors to Japan
Guyanese politicians of Indian descent